The 2020 OFC Nations Cup was originally to be the 11th edition of the OFC Nations Cup, the quadrennial international men's football championship of Oceania organised by the Oceania Football Confederation (OFC) scheduled for 6 to 20 June 2020.

The tournament was originally to be hosted by New Zealand, whose bid was chosen by the OFC on 10 January 2020. A total of eight teams would compete in the final tournament. New Zealand were the defending champions.

On 21 April 2020, OFC announced that due to the COVID-19 pandemic and the difficulty in rescheduling to another date in the FIFA International Match Calendar, the tournament would be cancelled.

Qualification
All 11 FIFA-affiliated national teams from OFC were eligible to enter the tournament.

A qualification round was originally scheduled to be played by four teams between 21 and 27 March 2020 at the FIFA Academy Field in Rarotonga, Cook Islands, where the winners would join the seven automatic qualifiers in the final tournament. However, the OFC announced on 9 March 2020 that all OFC tournaments were postponed until 6 May 2020 in response to the COVID-19 pandemic, before the tournament was cancelled.

Venues
The tournament was expected to be held in Auckland, with North Harbour Stadium and The Trusts Arena the likely venues.

References

External links
News > OFC Nations Cup 2020  at oceaniafootball.com

 
2020
Nations Cup
2020
2019–20 in New Zealand association football
Association football events cancelled due to the COVID-19 pandemic